The Melbourne Stars (WBBL) are an Australian women's Twenty20 cricket team based in St Kilda, Victoria. They are one of two teams from Melbourne to compete in the Women's Big Bash League, the other being the Melbourne Renegades. To date, the Stars' best performance occurred in WBBL06 when they ended the regular season as minor premiers before ultimately finishing as runners-up.

History

Formation
One of eight founding WBBL teams, the Melbourne Stars are aligned with the men's team of the same name. At the official WBBL launch on 10 July 2015, Meg Lanning was unveiled as the Stars' first-ever player signing. Lanning would also become the team's inaugural captain, while David Hemp was appointed as the inaugural coach.

The Stars played their first match on 5 December against the Brisbane Heat at the Junction Oval, winning by 20 runs.

Rivalries

Hobart Hurricanes
The Stars and Hobart Hurricanes have combined to produce an inordinate amount of matches with close finishes, including:

 16 January 2016, Blacktown ISP Oval: On a crumbling pitch, criticised earlier in the Australian summer for its sub-standard preparation, the Stars crawled to a first innings total of 7/96 before fighting back to have the Hurricanes at 4/49 in the twelfth over of the run chase. An unbroken stand of 48 runs from the next 51 balls between Corinne Hall and Amy Satterthwaite steered Hobart out of trouble, with Hall scoring a single on the final delivery to secure victory for the 'Canes.
 20 January 2017, Blundstone Arena: In a rain-affected encounter, Hobart posted a first innings total of 3/115 off 14 overs. Chasing a revised target of 98 from twelve overs, Melbourne lost 4/7 late in the match (including the wicket of Emma Inglis for 51 off 31) to leave a required twelve runs from the last two balls for victory. Jess Cameron proceeded to hit a six off the penultimate legal delivery before Hurricanes off-spinner Amy Satterthwaite bowled a front-foot no-ball while also conceding a four on what would have otherwise been the final ball of the innings. With Satterthwaite having to bowl the final delivery again, Cameron scored the remaining single needed to pull off an unlikely six-wicket win for the Stars.
 21 January 2017, Blundstone Arena: The following morning, on the last day of the WBBL|02 regular season, the Stars and Hurricanes met again—this time in what was effectively a quarter-final knockout match with the winner progressing to the semi-finals and the loser being eliminated from the tournament. Meg Lanning made 81 runs for the Stars in the first innings, earning Player of the Match honours, but was dismissed in the 19th over by a stunning Julie Hunter catch at square leg. A spell of 3/11 off four overs by Kristen Beams was not enough to defend the target of 136 as the Hurricanes scored the winning runs (through Corinne Hall again) with four wickets in hand and one ball remaining.

Melbourne Renegades
Noteworthy matches between the Stars and their cross-town rivals, the Melbourne Renegades, include:

 1 January 2017, Melbourne Cricket Ground: Played in front of a reported crowd of 24,547—as part of a double-header with the men's BBL, setting a new record for the highest non-standalone WBBL attendance—the rain-affected match ended in anticlimactic fashion with the Renegades adjudged nine-wicket winners via the Duckworth–Lewis–Stern method. Stars captain Meg Lanning initially protested the ruling with officiating umpires, claiming she had been given false information about the par score by the match referee.
 20 January 2018, Melbourne Cricket Ground: Chasing 119 for victory, Renegades captain Amy Satterthwaite—who looked to have been run out earlier in the innings and left the field, but was recalled after TV replays showed wicket-keeper Nicole Faltum had dislodged the bails prematurely—hit a six off the final delivery against the bowling of Georgia Elwiss to tie the game. With scores still level after the super over, the Stars were awarded the win on the boundary count back rule.
 29 December 2018, Docklands Stadium: The Renegades recorded the second one-wicket victory in the league's history when Lea Tahuhu, a fast bowler not known for her batting ability, hit the winning single off leg-spinning Stars captain Kristen Beams with just one ball to spare. Courtney Webb, on 21 not out, was the set batter at the non-striker's end.

Captaincy records

There have been five captains in the Stars' history, including matches featuring an acting captain.

Source:

Season summaries

Home grounds

Players

Current squad

Australian representatives
 The following is a list of cricketers who have played for the Melbourne Stars after making their debut in the national women's team (the period they spent as both a Melbourne Stars squad member and an Australian-capped player is in brackets):

Overseas marquees

Associate rookies

Statistics and awards

Team stats
Champions: 0
Runners-up: 1 – WBBL06
Minor premiers: 1 – WBBL|06
 Win–loss record:

 Highest score in an innings: 5/186 (20 overs) vs Adelaide Strikers, 2 November 2022
 Highest successful chase: 1/181 (19.3 overs) vs Adelaide Strikers, 21 November 2021
 Lowest successful defence: 7/108 (20 overs) vs Sydney Thunder, 26 October 2021
 Largest victory:
 Batting first: 54 runs vs Brisbane Heat, 26 December 2016
 Batting second: 46 balls remaining vs Hobart Hurricanes, 1 November 2020
 Longest winning streak: 6 matches (1–14 November 2020)
 Longest losing streak: 5 matches

Source:

Individual stats
 Most runs: Meg Lanning – 1,805
 Highest score in an innings: Lizelle Lee – 103* (65) vs Perth Scorchers, 2 November 2019
 Highest partnership: Meg Lanning and Mignon du Preez – 156* vs Adelaide Strikers, 8 January 2016
 Most wickets: Annabel Sutherland – 59
 Best bowling figures in an innings: Gemma Triscari – 4/10 (2 overs) vs Sydney Thunder, 15 January 2016
 Hat-tricks taken: Gemma Triscari vs Sydney Thunder, 15 January 2016
 Most catches (fielder): Meg Lanning – 29
 Most dismissals (wicket-keeper): Nicole Faltum – 35 (20 catches, 15 stumpings)

Source:

Individual awards
 Player of the Match:
 Meg Lanning – 13
 Annabel Sutherland – 4
 Alana King, Erin Osborne, Nat Sciver – 3 each
 Tess Flintoff, Emma Inglis, Lizelle Lee, Katie Mack – 2 each
 Kristen Beams, Katherine Brunt, Jess Cameron, Alice Capsey, Mignon du Preez, Georgia Elwiss, Kim Garth, Danielle Hazell, Sasha Moloney, Gemma Triscari, Elyse Villani – 1 each
 WBBL Player of the Tournament: Meg Lanning – WBBL01
 WBBL Team of the Tournament:
Meg Lanning (3) – WBBL01, WBBL02, WBBL06
 Kristen Beams – WBBL|02
 Alana King – WBBL|06
 Morna Nielsen – WBBL|01
 Nat Sciver – WBBL|06
 Annabel Sutherland – WBBL08
 WBBL Young Gun Award: Tess Flintoff – WBBL08

Sponsors

See also

Melbourne Stars
Hobart Hurricanes (WBBL)
Melbourne Renegades
Melbourne Renegades (WBBL)
Victorian Cricket Association
Victorian Spirit

References

Notes

External links
 

 
Women's Big Bash League teams
Cricket clubs in Melbourne
Cricket clubs in Victoria (Australia)
Cricket clubs established in 2015
2015 establishments in Australia
Cricket in Melbourne
Sport in the City of Port Phillip